Baatsuri Enkhbaatar (born 30 March 1985) is a Mongolian international footballer. He has appeared 3 times for the Mongolia national football team.

References

1985 births
Mongolian footballers
Living people
Association football midfielders
Mongolia international footballers